Templario (real name not revealed; born February 27, 1992) is a Mexican luchador enmascarado (or masked professional wrestler), currently working for Mexican wrestling promotion Consejo Mundial de Lucha Libre (CMLL). Templario portrays a rudo ("bad guy") wrestling character. It is uncertain exactly when Templario made his professional wrestling career and if he has used a different ring name before adopting the "Templario" persona around 2012 or 2013.

He is a member of Los Guerreros Laguneros, with Último Guerrero and Gran Guerrero. Prior to joining CMLL in early 2016, he wrestled on the Mexican independent circuit for a number of professional wrestling promotions including International Wrestling Revolution Group and Cara Lucha. He won the 2020 Reyes del Aire tournament, and the 2021 Torneo Nacional de Parejas Increibles with Volador Jr.

Professional wrestling career
Several wrestlers have used the ring name "Templario" (Spanish for "Knights Templar") in Mexico over the years. Due to multiple wrestlers using the same name, it makes it difficult to pinpoint exactly when he made his in-ring debut. Templario's real name has not been revealed, nor reported on, which is a tradition in Lucha Libre when a wrestler has not been unmasked.

Templario wanted to be a professional wrestler from a young age, something that both his family and friends encouraged him to pursue. Initially, he looked for opportunities in his native Calpulalpan, and then later traveled to Pachuca but was unsuccessful in both places. He ended up traveling to Mexico City, where he began a friendship with Último Guerrero who both helped train him and get contacts for his first match. Early in his career, Templario unsuccessfully challenged Turbo for the NWA Mexico Welterweight Championship. By 2012, Templario began working on a regular basis, primarily in Mexico City and the surrounding federal district. On September 17, 2012, he competed in a Reyes del Aire ("King of the Air") tournament, won by Camaleón. In December 2012 Templario competed for the Trofeo Último Guerrero in honor of his trainer and friend. The 10-man torneo cibernetico elimination match was won by Eddy Vega.

Consejo Mundial de Lucha Libre (2016–present)

Templario made his initial appearance for Consejo Mundial de Lucha Libre (CMLL), on July 10, 2016, where he, Flyer, and Pegasso lost to the trio of Forastero, Maquiavelo, and Skándalo on an Arena México show. After he joined CMLL, Templario changed his mask design to include a patriarchal cross symbol on the front of the mask. Wrestlers under a CMLL contract are allowed to work on the independent circuit on days when CMLL does not require them to participate in a show, which allowed Templario to work for Promociones Cara Lucha on a regular basis. Templario defeated Andy Boy, Toro Negro Jr. and Latigo in a one-night tournament to become the inaugural Cara Lucha The Best Champion. The following month, Templario teamed up with one of his CMLL trainers, Último Guerrero, for Cara Lucha's Torneo Juventud y Gloria  ("Youth and Glory tournament) where they defeated Fly Warrior and Hechicero in the first round and Latigo and Trauma I in the semifinals.

By the end of 2017, Templario was involved in a multi-man steel cage match where the loser would be forced to unmask. The match, the main event of the 2017 Sin Salida supercard show, saw Templario escape the cage as the seventh man to do so, watching from the outside as Starman defeated and unmasked El Hijo del Signo. In early 2018, Templario teamed up with Akuma to compete in a tournament for the vacant CMLL Arena Coliseo Tag Team Championship. The makeshift duo was eliminated in the first round by Fuego and Star Jr. Next, Templario was entered into the 2018 Gran Alternativa tournament, where CMLL bookers would pair up a rookie wrestler with a veteran wrestler for a 16-team tournament. Templario teamed up with Último Guerrero and fought their way to the finals by defeating Máscara Año 2000 and Universo 2000 Jr., Audaz and Kraneo, and finally Carístico and Star Jr. The following week, the team lost in the finals to Flyer and Volador Jr.

Los Guerreros Laguneros (2018–present)
Templario was brought in as a replacement for Soberano Jr. for the Blue Panther 40th Anniversary Show by his trainer Último Guerrero. After the show, Templario joined Último Guerrero's group, Los Guerreros Laguneros (Spanish for "The Warriors of the Lagoon"; Guerrero, Euforia and Gran Guerrero) as their fourth member. On October 26, Templario won a torneo cibernético elimination match over Audaz, Black Panther, El Cuatrero, Esfinge, Flyer, Forastero, Guerrero Maya Jr, Kawato-San, Tritón, Virus. and Tiger to earn a match for the Rey del Inframundo ("King of the Underworld") championship. Templario lost the championship match to Sansón on CMLL's 2018 Día de Muertos show. Late 2019 saw Templario compete in the Leyenda de Plata, one of CMLL's major tournaments, but he was the tenth wrestler to be eliminated as he was pinned by Volador Jr.

Templario competed in the 2019 Reyes del Aire, marking his participation in the annual tournament for the first time. Templario was the fifteenth and last competitor to be eliminated from the match as he was pinned by tournament winner Titán. He also made his first wrestling related journey to Japan, competing in the annual CMLL/New Japan Pro-Wrestling co-promoted Fantastica Mania tour. He primarily teamed up with Bullet Club members Gedo and Taiji Ishimori, facing off against Audaz and various tag team partners. On March 30, 2019, Templario unsuccessfully challenged Soberano Jr. for the Mexican National Welterweight Championship. Templario and long-time rival Audaz were paired up for the 2019 Torneo Nacional de Parejas Increíbles, but lost in the first round to Atlantis and Negro Casas. On October 6, 2019, Templario once again challenged Soberano Jr. for the Mexican National Welterweight Championship, with the match ending in a draw with a  double pin in the third fall.

Templario started out by winning the 2020 Reyes del Aire lastly eliminating Star Jr. from the match. Templario and Soberano Jr. found themselves teamed up for the 2020 Torneo Nacional de Parejas Increíbles as part of their ongoing storyline rivalry. The team was eliminated in the first round by Bárbaro Cavernario and Volador Jr. When CMLL reintroduced the Mexican National Tag Team Championship in February 2020, Templario and El Hijo de Villano III teamed up for a 16-team tournament. The duo defeated Dulce Gardenia and Fuego in the opening round, Disturbio and Virus in the quarterfinals and Soberano Jr. and Titán in the semifinals. After three victories, the team lost to Atlantis Jr. and Flyer in the finals.

On September 24, 2021, at Aniversario 88, Templario defeated Dragón Rojo Jr. to win the vacant Mexican National Middleweight Championship.

United States independent circuit (2019–present)
Templario made his US debut on June 13, 2019, on a show in Pittsburgh, Pennsylvania where he lost to fellow CMLL wrestler Soberano Jr. He returned to the US as a result of CMLL's working relationship with Ring of Honor (ROH) teaming with Hechicero and Bárbaro Cavernario as they lost to Carístico, Soberano Jr., and Stuka Jr. as part of ROH's Summer Supercard pay-per-view show. He later worked for Warrior Wrestling based in Chicago, Illinois, losing to Soberano Jr. on September 1, 2019, and defeating Jake Lander on their December show.

Championships and accomplishments
Cara Lucha
Cara Lucha The Best Championship (1 time)
Consejo Mundial de Lucha Libre
Mexican National Middleweight Championship (1 time, current)
Reyes del Aire (2020)
Torneo Nacional de Parejas Increibles (2021) – with Volador Jr.
 Pro Wrestling Illustrated
 Ranked No. 392 of the top 500 singles wrestlers in the PWI 500 in 2019

Footnotes

References

1992 births
Living people
Mexican male professional wrestlers
Masked wrestlers
Unidentified wrestlers
Professional wrestlers from Tlaxcala
21st-century professional wrestlers
Mexican National Middleweight Champions